Oxford Road is an urban street and major arterial road in Reading, Berkshire, England, Beginning near the town centre at the meeting of St. Mary's Butts/West Street/Broad Street. The road leads west to Pangbourne, continuing eventually to the city of Oxford. The road was previously known as Pangbourne Lane.

Most of the road is designated the A329. Reading West railway station is near the eastern end of Oxford Road. Tilehurst railway station is near the western end of the road, serving the Reading suburb of Tilehurst. The road to the northwest becomes Purley Rise at Purley on Thames, leading to Pangbourne. To the east in central Reading, it becomes Broad Street, the main pedestrianised shopping street in Reading.

Travelling from east to west, the road passes the Broad Street Mall shopping centre before crossing the town's Inner Distribution Road on a bridge. Some  further on, Holy Trinity Church is passesd on the right, closely followed by the Oxford Road Community School at 146 Oxford Road. Battle Library is at 420 Oxford Road. The Oxford Road Community Garden is located in Western Elms Avenue, off the Oxford Road.

The entrance to the Battle Hospital (closed in 2005) was located at 344 Oxford Road, where the original gate still stands.

The Chatham Street development off Oxford Road, which is still under construction (as of 2010), offers possible improvement for this part of Reading with a £250 million investment scheme, including new shops, accommodation, services and leisure facilities.

Notable residents
Mike Oldfield's Family lived on Western Elms Avenue, where his Father worked as a General Practitioner.

Trivia 
The first Little Chef Restaurant was opened on Oxford Road in 1958.

References

External links 

Geography of Reading, Berkshire
Shopping streets in Reading, Berkshire

Tilehurst